Lukas Spengler (born 16 September 1994) is a Swiss former professional cyclist, who rode professionally for the  team from 2017 to 2019.

Major results

2011
 2nd Road race, National Junior Road Championships
2012
 3rd Time trial, National Junior Road Championships
2014
 2nd Road race, National Under-23 Road Championships
 3rd Triptyque Ardennais
 3rd Züri-Metzgete
 5th ZLM Tour
 5th Gran Premio Palio del Recioto
 7th Giro del Belvedere
2015
 1st Paris–Roubaix Espoirs
 3rd Road race, National Under-23 Road Championships
2016
 1st Prologue (TTT) Tour de Berlin
 2nd Time trial, National Under-23 Road Championships
2017
 5th Tour de Berne
 5th Schaal Sels

References

External links

1994 births
Living people
Swiss male cyclists
People from Schaffhausen
Sportspeople from the canton of Schaffhausen